The Message of Death (Spanish: El mensaje de la muerte) is a 1953 Mexican thriller film directed by Zacarías Gómez Urquiza and starring Miguel Torruco, Rebeca Iturbide and Elena Julián.

Cast
 Miguel Torruco 
 Rebeca Iturbide 
 Elena Julián 
 José María Linares-Rivas 
 Maruja Grifell 
 Martha Lipuzcoa 
 Joaquín García Vargas 
 Juan Orraca 
 Julián de Meriche 
 Pepe Nava 
 Manuel Resendiz 
 Valente Quintana 
 Yolanda Montes 
 Matilde Sánchez 
  The Nicholas Brothers as Themselves

References

Bibliography 
 María Luisa Amador. Cartelera cinematográfica, 1950-1959. UNAM, 1985.

External links 
 

1953 films
1950s thriller films
Mexican thriller films
1950s Spanish-language films
Films directed by Zacarías Gómez Urquiza
Mexican black-and-white films
1950s Mexican films